The Congress of French Culture in Florida, also referred to as CCFF or simply Le Congrès, is an academic organization who holds competitions annually in Orlando, Florida with the purpose of promoting competency in the French culture and language among students across Florida. The name also refers to the organizational body that oversees the event and its preparation.

History
The foundation of the competition was conceived by three French instructors from Jacksonville, Florida in the fall of 1952: Lelia Alexander of Julia E. Landon High School (now Julia Landon College Preparatory and Leadership Development School), Cornelia Burge of Duncan U. Fletcher High School, and Doris McCleary of Andrew Jackson High School. The first competition was held in April of 1953 at the Provençal House of Rollins College and continued to take place there on an annual basis.

Suzanne Carrell

In 1962, French professor Suzanne Carrell facilitated the relocation of the event to Jacksonville University where it had remained for several years. Carrell, a French national, was highly praised for her work in strengthening the cultural ties between the United States and France, particularly in the relationship between the sister cities of Jacksonville and Nantes. In 1980, a scholarship open to participants of the Congrès was established in her name and continues to this day. In recognition of her work, French President Jacques Chirac decreed upon her the French Legion of Honor on the competition's fiftieth year (2002). On the competition's sixtieth year (2012), Carrell would also receive the National Order of Merit. 

Despite having retired in 1989, Carrell continued to chair the organization until her passing in 2019.

After Jacksonville
Today, the competition is principally held in Orlando, Florida.

Purpose
Students from participating Florida middle schools and high schools compete in various challenges designed to test fluency in French as well as knowledge of French culture. These challenges include la lecture (reading proficiency), le discours (improvised oration), la déclamation (poetry recitation), and le casse-tête (lit. "break-head", a quiz bowl). The rewards for these challenges are primarily ribbons and plaques. Separately, students who demonstrate in writing an intent to continue their studies in French (especially into higher education) are given the opportunity to win multiple scholarships, the most notable of which is the Bourse Suzanne Carrell. The organization's homepage claims that the event serves to allow students to "meet other enthusiastic Francophiles who inspire one another."

References

External links
 Current Homepage for Le Congrès de la Culture Française en Floride
 "Retired Professor Honored by French Legion of Honor" (Jacksonville University press release)

Recurring events established in 1952
Competitions
Education in Florida
Francophonie
1952 establishments in Florida